James Dilworth (15 August 1815 – 23 December 1894) was a New Zealand farmer, investor, speculator and philanthropist. He was born in Donaghmore, County Tyrone, Ireland, on 15 August 1815 and attended the nearby Royal School, Dungannon, where a blue plaque was unveiled in his memory on 7 October 2014, by the Ulster History Circle.

Political career
Dilworth was elected to the first Auckland Provincial Council for the Southern Division electorate in August 1853. He remained a member of the provincial council until September 1861.

Charitable work
The Dilworth Trust Board was the benefactor of the estate of Dilworth, who received his legal advice from the solicitor Samuel Jackson. The trust funds Dilworth School a full boarding school for boys in Auckland, New Zealand. A school where all boys are on full scholarships covering all education and boarding costs.

In 2018, Dilworth was posthumously inducted into the New Zealand Business Hall of Fame.

References

1815 births
1894 deaths
New Zealand farmers
New Zealand philanthropists
Irish emigrants to New Zealand (before 1923)
People from County Tyrone
Members of the Auckland Provincial Council
19th-century New Zealand politicians
19th-century philanthropists